The Talbot River is a river in northern Fiordland, New Zealand. A tributary of Joes River, it rises west of Gulliver Peak.

See also
List of rivers of New Zealand

References

Rivers of Fiordland